Elizabeth River flows into Darwin Harbour close to Darwin in the Northern Territory of Australia.

Course
The headwaters of the river rise south of Noonamah and flow in a north westerly direction and cross the Stuart Highway south of Humpty Doo. It continues through an estuarine area and discharges into the East Arm of Darwin Harbour then Beagle Gulf and eventually into the Timor Sea.

Climate 

The climate of the Elizabeth River region is monsoon tropical with two distinct seasons: the Dry and the Wet. The Dry lasts for 6 months between April and September with an average rainfall of 24 mm, whereas the Wet lasts between October and March with an average monthly rainfall of 254 mm/month (according to the Bureau of Meteorology, 1999). The majority of the rain falls between December and April. Runoff varies between 250–1000 mm.

Peak flow for the Elizabeth River occurs in February with 389Ml/day, after which it slowly decreases until July when there is no freshwater input into Darwin Harbour until the onset of the following wet season (Padovan 1997). Cyclone frequency is low to moderate.

Water quality 

The water quality at the upper estuary monitoring sites of the Northern Territory Government was 2011 in excellent condition. Water quality at the freshwater monitoring sites was in very good condition in 2011.

Geology  

The underlying lithology is dominated by Permian siltstones and sandstones.

See also

Elizabeth River Bridge

References 

Rivers of the Northern Territory